Gaadiidka FC is a Somali football club based in Mogadishu, Somalia which currently plays in Somalia League the top division of Somali Football.

Stadium
Currently the team plays at the 30,000 capacity Banadir Stadium.

Colours
The club plays in blue kits.

References

External links
 Soccerway
 GolFM.net

Football clubs in Somalia
Sport in Mogadishu